Mechai Viravaidya (born 17 January 1941,) is a former politician and activist in Thailand who promoted condoms, family planning and AIDS awareness in Thailand. Since the 1970s, Mechai has been affectionately known as "Mr. Condom", and condoms are often referred as "mechais" in Thailand. From the time that he began his work, the average number of children in Thai families has decreased from 7 to 1.5. He has been credited with leading efforts which improved the lives of millions of people.

Early life
Mechai was born in Bangkok to a Scottish mother and a Thai father, both of whom were doctors and had met when studying in Edinburgh. He is one of four children. His younger brother, Sunya, is the founder of the Pattaya International Hospital. One of his sisters, Sumalee Viravaidya, was a noted journalist in the 1970s, writing for the Bangkok Post and the Nation. Mechai was educated in Australia at Geelong Grammar School and at Trinity College at the University of Melbourne, where he obtained a Bachelor of Commerce degree. In 1965, he returned to Thailand and in 1966 started to work in family planning, emphasizing the use of condoms. In 1973, he left the civil service and founded a non-profit service organization, the Population and Community Development Association (PDA), to continue his efforts to improve the lives of the rural poor. He used such events as holding condom blowing contests for school children, encouraging taxi drivers to hand out condoms to their customers, and founding a restaurant chain called Cabbages and Condoms, where condoms are given to customers with the bill.

An interesting side note is the family planning clinic which openly operates next to the Cabbages and Condoms restaurant. This is one of several places in Bangkok where poor women can receive pregnancy termination, a practice which is legal in the country per Section 305 of the Thailand penal code, but often perceived as illegal. The clinic is permitted by the authorities due to the dangers of unsafe abortion by Thai women because of "economic difficulties".

Later life
Mechai served as deputy minister of industry from 1985 to 1986 under prime minister Prem Tinsulanonda. He served as senator from 1987 until 1991. During this time AIDS appeared in Thailand, and he increased his efforts to promote sexual-safety awareness.

A military coup in 1991 installed prime minister Anand Panyarachun who then appointed Mechai minister for tourism, information and AIDS. He was able to start a large and quite successful AIDS education campaign and served until 1992. At that time he became the chairman of the Foundation for International Education, the non-profit organization that serves as the governing body of NIST International School. Mechai continued to serve as the chair until stepping down in May, 2002.

In 1995 he was appointed an Honorary Officer of the Order of Australia, for "service to Australian-Thai relations and contributions to the world AIDS debate".

In 2004, Mechai again became a senator. In 2006 he won praise from the toilet industry (but criticism from the retail industry) for proposing that retailers be obliged to build a public toilet for every 10 square metres of retail space.

As of 2007, he continues to oversee rural development and health initiatives as the Chairman of PDA, now the largest NGO in Thailand, with 600 employees and 12,000 volunteers. On May 29, 2007, PDA was awarded the 2007 Bill & Melinda Gates Foundation's Gates Award in recognition of its pioneering work in family planning and HIV/AIDS prevention. This award came with funds of $1,000,000.

References

Further reading
Thomas D'Agnes. From condoms to cabbages: An authorized biography of Mechai Viravaidya. Post Books 2001.

External links 
 Curriculum Vitae of Mechai Viravaidya
 Global Health Champion page, Rx for Survival Series
 A Restaurant with a Mission - Article about Viravaidya and the Cabbages and Condoms restaurant concept.
 Podcast Interview with Mechai Viravaidya Social Innovation Conversations, June 24, 2008

1941 births
Living people
HIV/AIDS activists
People educated at Geelong Grammar School
People educated at Trinity College (University of Melbourne)
Mechai Viravaidya
Ramon Magsaysay Award winners
Mechai Viravaidya
Mechai Viravaidya
Honorary Officers of the Order of Australia
Winners of the Nikkei Asia Prize
Mechai Viravaidya
Mechai Viravaidya